Baby teeth are the first set of teeth in the growth development of humans and many other mammals.

Baby Teeth may also refer to:

Music
 Baby Teeth (band), a Chicago-based indie pop/rock band
 Babyteeth (Therapy? album), 1991
 Baby Teeth (Screaming Females album), 2006

Other
 Babyteeth (film), a 2019 film
 Babyteeth (play), a play by Rita Kalnejais
 Babyteeth (typeface), a 1966 typeface by Milton Glaser 
 Baby Teeth, a novel by Zoje Stage